Leslie Ann Stefanson is an American actress. She is most known for playing the title role as Capt. Elisabeth Campbell in the film The General's Daughter, and Joan Bennett Kennedy in the television miniseries Jackie, Ethel, Joan: The Women of Camelot.

Biography
Stefanson was born in Fargo, North Dakota in 1971, and raised in Moorhead, Minnesota. She is of Icelandic heritage, with her paternal grandparents, Skúli Stefánsson and Heffie Einarson, emigrating from Iceland. She studied literature in New Jersey at Drew University and in New York at Columbia University. In 1993, she graduated with a degree in English literature from Barnard College. She was a member of a New York theater group, modeled, and appeared in an ad for Lee's Jeans in 1997, which was shown during the Super Bowl. 

On August 31, 2008, Stefanson gave birth to her first child, a son, with actor James Spader. As of 2019, she makes bronze and terracotta sculptures in Los Angeles and New York City.

Filmography

References

External links

20th-century American actresses
21st-century American actresses
20th-century American sculptors
21st-century American sculptors
20th-century American women artists
21st-century American women artists
Actresses from North Dakota
American film actresses
American women sculptors
Barnard College alumni
Living people
People from Fargo, North Dakota
People from Moorhead, Minnesota
American people of Icelandic descent
Year of birth missing (living people)